Iván Mocholí Calabuig (born 1 September 1983) is a former Spanish sprinter who competed primarily in the 60 and 100 metres. He represented his country at the 2006 and 2010 World Indoor Championships.

International competitions

Personal bests

Outdoor
100 metres – 10.39 (+1.8 m/s, Vitoria 2004)
200 metres – 21.08 (0.0 m/s, Soria 2004)

Indoor
60 metres – 6.68 (San Sebastián 2006)
200 metres – 21.30 (Valencia 2004)

References

1983 births
Living people
Spanish male sprinters
People from Horta Sud
Sportspeople from the Province of Valencia